The Ghanta Ghar (घन्टाघर), situated in the capital city of Kathmandu, is the  oldest clock tower of Nepal. It lies in front of Rani Pokhari and near Trichandra College. It was built by Rana Prime Minister Bir Shumsher. The original clock tower was designed after Big Ben of London, as Western influence crept into Nepalese architecture during the Rana era. The GhantaGhar that stands today was rebuilt after the 1990 BS earthquake, standing on the site of the original after the old tower was destroyed by the earthquake.

Etymology
The name Ghanta Ghar is made up of two Nepali words, "Ghanta" and "Ghar", which mean "Hour" and "House" in English respectively.

References

Towers in Kathmandu
Clock towers in Nepal
Tourist attractions in Kathmandu
1894 establishments in Nepal